was a Japanese professional baseball first baseman and designated hitter in Nippon Professional Baseball for the Hankyu Braves.

Takai was born on 1 February 1945 in Imabari, Ehime. He attended  and played for the  baseball team before signing with the Hankyu Braves in 1964. Takai was originally signed to the practice squad and made his Nippon Professional Baseball debut in 1966. Over the course of his career, Takai became known for his extensive research into opposing pitchers. He set the NPB record for pinch-hit home runs, with 27. After he retired in 1982, Takai served as a broadcaster.

Takai died of kidney failure on 13 December 2019, at a hospital in Nishinomiya, aged 74.

References

External links

1945 births
2019 deaths
People from Imabari, Ehime
Hankyu Braves players
Nippon Professional Baseball first basemen
Japanese baseball players
Baseball people from Ehime Prefecture
Deaths from kidney failure
Nippon Professional Baseball designated hitters